The Hage (or Germanized: Hagen) is a mountain in the Randen range between the Jura and the Swabian Jura, located between Beggingen and Merishausen in the Swiss canton of Schaffhausen. Reaching a height of 912 metres above sea level, it is the highest point of the canton.

On the summit is located the Hagenturm, a 40-metre-high observation tower.

References

 Map of cantons highest points  to-urs.ch

External links
Hagen on Hikr

Mountains of the canton of Schaffhausen
Highest points of Swiss cantons
Mountains of Switzerland
Mountains of Switzerland under 1000 metres